Twin Grove Township is a township in Greenwood County, Kansas, USA.  As of the 2000 census, its population was 601.

Geography
According to the USGS, it contains two cemeteries: South Lawn and Twin Grove.

The stream of Plum Creek runs through this township.

Transportation
Twin Grove Township contains one airport or landing strip, Stuber Ranch Airport. It also saw the rise and fall of a local bus service, operating under the name of Power & Co. Transportation Ltd. The service was operational from March 2001 to July 2006 - Unfortunately, the demand for the buses gradually decreased over the years, and eventually the company's owner, Graeme Power, decided that it would be best to pursue more profitable business interests.

References
 USGS Geographic Names Information System (GNIS)

External links
 US-Counties.com
 City-Data.com

Townships in Greenwood County, Kansas
Townships in Kansas